Froxfield Bottom Lock is a lock on the Kennet and Avon Canal, at Froxfield, Wiltshire, England.

The lock has a rise/fall of 7 ft 0 in (2.13 m).

References

See also

Locks on the Kennet and Avon Canal

Locks on the Kennet and Avon Canal
Canals in Wiltshire